The WPA Field House and Pump Station is a historic water works facility  on Henry Bailey Turner Road in Scituate, Massachusetts. The field house at Bound Brook Park was built in 1938–9 with funding from the Works Progress Administration, and is a rare historical recreational building in the town. Its front facade is sheltered by a porch that lies under the roof and is supported by stone piers; there is a center entry that is flanked on each side by a window. The building was used for storage (in the basement) and for community group meetings, and was shuttered in 1981. In 2009 it was undergoing restoration.

The building and its grounds were listed on the National Register of Historic Places in 2009.

See also
National Register of Historic Places listings in Plymouth County, Massachusetts

References

National Register of Historic Places in Plymouth County, Massachusetts
Neoclassical architecture in Massachusetts
Buildings and structures completed in 1938
Buildings and structures in Scituate, Massachusetts